{{Infobox election
| election_name = 2004 United States Senate election in North Carolina
| country = North Carolina
| type = presidential
| ongoing = no
| previous_election = 1998 United States Senate election in North Carolina
| previous_year = 1998
| next_election = 2010 United States Senate election in North Carolina
| next_year = 2010
| election_date = November 2, 2004
| image_size = 
| image1 = 
| nominee1 = Richard Burr
| party1 = Republican Party (United States)
| popular_vote1 = 1,791,450
| percentage1 = 51.6%
| image2 = 
| nominee2 = Erskine Bowles
| party2 = Democratic Party (United States)
| popular_vote2 = 1,632,527
| percentage2 = 47.0%
| map_image = 2004 United States Senate election in North Carolina results map by county.svg
| map_size = 325px
| map_caption = County resultsBurr:    Bowles:    
| title = U.S. Senator
| before_election = John Edwards
| before_party = Democratic Party (United States)
| after_election = Richard Burr
| after_party = Republican Party (United States)
}}

The 2004 United States Senate election in North Carolina''' was held on November 2, 2004. Incumbent Democratic U.S. Senator John Edwards decided to retire from the Senate after one term in order to run unsuccessfully for the 2004 Democratic Party presidential nomination, and become his party's vice presidential nominee. Republican Richard Burr won the open seat, making it the fifth consecutive election in which partisan control of the seat changed.

Primaries

Democratic 
Erskine Bowles won the Democratic Party's nomination unopposed. He had been the party's nominee for the state's other Senate seat in 2002.

Republican

General election

Candidates 
 Tom Bailey (L), Vietnam War veteran
 Erskine Bowles (D), businessman and President Bill Clinton's chief of staff
 Richard Burr (R), U.S. Representative from North Carolina's 5th congressional district since 1995

Campaign 
Both major-party candidates engaged in negative campaign tactics, with Bowles' campaign attacking Burr for special interest donations and his positions on trade legislation, and Burr's campaign attacking Bowles for his connections to the Clinton administration. Both attacks had basis in reality: Burr's campaign raised funds from numerous political action committees and at least 72 of the 100 largest Fortune 500 companies, while Bowles departed from the Clinton administration in the midst of the Monica Lewinsky scandal.

Burr won the election by 4%. He joined the Senate in January 2005. Bowles went on to become the president of the UNC system.

Predictions

Polling

Results

See also 
 2004 United States Senate elections

Notes

References

United States Senate
2004
North Carolina